Don Harrison (August 8, 1936 – May 2, 1998) was an anchor on CNN Headline News from 1982 until his death from renal cancer in 1998.  He was a member of the original team of anchors when Headline News went on the air for the first time as "CNN2" in 1982. 

Harrison, a native of Ottawa, Kansas, spent over three decades in the broadcast business. For 11 years he was on the staff of KCMO-TV (now KCTV) in Kansas City, and for another four years he worked for KMSP in Minneapolis-St. Paul. He anchored WBAL-TV's Action News in Baltimore in the early 1970s. He was the popular primary anchor at Tampa's WTSP from 1979 to 1982.

Harrison was also in high demand for voice-over work, mostly for Turner properties, including TBS, Turner Sports and CNN International. In 1987, Harrison won the CableACE award for best news anchor. It was recognition for a man characterized by a firm voice, elegant style and deep journalistic integrity. His colleagues at CNN also remember Harrison as the man with a wry smile and infectious humor, a man it was rewarding and a privilege to work with.

Harrison lost a leg due to bone cancer at age 13 and a kidney, also because of cancer, in 1993. He was married and had two sons and a daughter.

External links
 Photos of Don Harrison at Headline News
 Video clips of Don Harrison on Headline News
 TVARK online museum CNN Headline News entry for 1982
 
 AP's obituary
 Chicago Sun-Times' obituary
 CNN's obituary
 LA Times' obituary
 Topeka Capital-Journal's obituary
 American Journalism Review article about the time when Don Harrison was almost forced to announce the death of a U.S. president who was still alive
 Harrison joins Baltimore's WBAL-TV in Broadcasting, January 7, 1974

1937 births
1998 deaths
American television news anchors
People from Ottawa, Kansas
Deaths from kidney cancer
American male journalists